Los Santos Wind Farm, is a wind energy project located in Los Santos region of Costa Rica, alongside the Inter-American Highway (Route 2). It is operated by the local public utilities cooperative, Coopesantos, and generates 30% of their distributed energy.

It has 15 wind turbines, at a height of 44 meters each, with an individual output of 0.85 MW, for a combined total of 12.75MW.

References  

Renewable energy power stations in Costa Rica
Wind farms